Mother coins, alternatively known as seed coins or matrix coins, were coins used during the early stages of the casting process to produce Chinese, Japanese, Korean, Ryukyuan, and Vietnamese cash coins. As cash coins were produced using sand casting mother coins were first produced to form the basis for all subsequent cash coins to be released into circulation. Under the Han dynasty in China mints started producing cash coins using bronze master moulds to solve inconsistencies in circulating coins, this only worked partially and by the sixth century mother coins were introduced to solve these inconsistencies almost completely. The Japanese adopted the usage of mother coins in the 600s and they were used to manufacture cast Japanese coins until the Meiji period. The mother coin was initially prepared by engraving a pattern with the legend of the cash coin which had to be manufactured. In the manufacturing process mother coins were used to impress the design in moulds which were made from easily worked metals such as tin and these moulds were then placed in a rectangular frame made from pear wood filled with fine wet sand, possibly mixed with clay, and enhanced with either charcoal or coal dust to allow for the molten metal to smoothly flow through, this frame would act as a layer that separates the two parts of the coin moulds. The mother coin was recovered by the people who cast the coins and was placed on top of the second frame and the aforementioned process was repeated until fifteen layers of moulds had formed based on this single mother coin. After cooling down a "coin tree" (錢樹) or long metallic stick with the freshly minted cash coins attached in the shape of "branches" would be extracted from the mould and these coins could be broken off and if necessary had their square holes chiseled clean, after this the coins were placed on a long metal rod to simultaneously remove the rough edges for hundreds of coins and then these cash coins could be strung together and enter circulation.

The Sangpyeong Tongbo (常平通寶) cash coins were known as yeopjeon (葉錢, "leaf coins") because of the way that cash coins resembled leaves on a branch when they were being cast in the mould.

The introduction and subsequent usage of mother coins in the casting process proved to be paramount in controlling the quality of the cash coins. Only minor differences between mother coins remained, as the carver was very skilled. If mother coins had even the slightest error than this error would be visible on every cash coin that would be produced from it, which is why mother coins with any imperfections were quickly withdrawn from the production process before impacting many coins meant for circulation. Due to the high quality control mother coins with deformities are almost never found.

Wax mother coins 

Under the Sui and Tang dynasties mother coins reached their definite form and were produced in moulds engraved by ancestor coins, however during this same period a casting technique called "the lost wax method" was used to cast for example Kaiyuan Tongbao cash coins, in this method mother coins made from wax rather than metal were used, these mother coins were produced in large quantities because they were very cheap to make, unlike metal mother coins these wax mother coins stayed in the clay moulds and when the mould heated up they would melt away leaving a cavity for the molten metal to pour into forming the coins. This technique was also used for casting other bronze items however it was only used for casting coinage during the Sui and Tang dynasties and its sudden discontinuation pointed out to the fact that it was probably inefficient for mass-producing small items such as coins.

Ancestor coins 

Ancestor coins also known as engraved mother coins were introduced around 1730 in middle of the eighteenth century to improve the quality control of mother coins, these ancestor coins were used to cast more mother coins and from a single ancestor thousands of mother coins could be cast. The production process of making mother coins with ancestor coins was the same as it was for the casting of circulation coins from mother coins, however these coins were usually only produced for a new reign title, when preparing to cast new cash coins with new inscriptions for a recently ascended emperor, a mint would first engrave an ancestor coin out of fine brass which would form the basis for mother coins. The introduction of ancestor coins under the Manchu Qing dynasty lead to all mints having more consistently produced coinages and smaller variations between the coins produced by separate mints in both inscription (or legend) as well as in quality.

Rare specimens 

 On November 30, 2014, a Qixiang Tongbao (祺祥重寶) engraved mother coin was sold at an auction in the city of Beijing for $129,843 (which at the time was worth 808,500 yuan).

Iutsushi 

Iutsushi (Japanese: 鋳写し) is a Japanese term that could be translated as "to cast a copy from", this refers to a technique where regular circulating cash coins were used as mother coins, this was a very common practice in Japan until the seventeenth century and mostly Chinese cash coins from the Song and Ming dynasties were used. Outside of Japan this technique was also largely used to produce counterfeit currency by illegal Chinese and private Vietnamese mints, as the cash coins produced by using the Iutsushi technique were less crisp than their mother coins, often have smooth reverses, and the fact that these coins shrunk after metal had cooled down, Iutsushi coins are also diminutive in size compared to the original circulating coins and the inscriptions are also inferior in quality as they display more softer and quite blurry. For these reasons the cash coins produced using this technique were among the cash coins known as Bitasen (鐚銭) or bad metal coins in Japan.

Due to Iutsushi, it is often very hard to distinguish Japanese Bitasen from Chinese counterfeit cash coins as well as privately produced cash coins from Vietnam as many of these used the same inscriptions; it is not uncommon for there to be large variations in both the quality and metal content of original coins that have been heavily circulated.

References 

Coins of ancient China
Casting (manufacturing)
Chinese numismatics
Cash coins